This is a timeline of women's suffrage in Utah. Women earned the right to vote on February 12, 1870 while Utah was still a territory. The first woman to vote under equal suffrage laws was Seraph Young on February 14, 1870. During this time, suffragists in Utah continued to work with women in other states to promote women's suffrage. Women continued to vote until 1887 when the Edmunds-Tucker Act was passed. When Utah was admitted as a state in 1896, women regained the right to vote. On September 30, 1919 Utah ratifies the Nineteenth Amendment. Native American women did not have full voting rights in Utah until 1957.

19th century

1840s 
1842

 Female Relief Society of Nauvoo is formed.

1860s 
1868

 Newspaper editorial from The New York Times about giving Utah women equal suffrage is appreciated in Utah.
 The Deseret News posts an editorial about the justice of women's suffrage.

1870s 
1870

February 12: Utah gives women the right to vote.
February 14: First woman to vote in the United States under equal suffrage laws was Seraph Young in Salt Lake City.
1871

Susan B. Anthony and Elizabeth Cady Stanton visit Salt Lake City.
1872

 The Woman's Exponent is created.

1879

Emmeline B. Wells represents Utah at the National Woman's Suffrage Convention.

1880s 
1880

 A case in the Supreme Court of the Territory attempts to erase the names of several women from the voter registration list, but does not succeed.

1882

 In Salt Lake City, a registrar refuses to add women to the list of registered voters. The case is settled and women continue to vote.

1887

 Passage of the Edmunds-Tucker Act disenfranchises Utah women.
1888

 Mrs. Arthur Brown and Emily S. Richards represent Utah at the National Suffrage Convention in Washington, D.C.
September: Clara Bewick Colby and Elizabeth Lyle Saxon visit Salt Lake City to lecture on suffrage.
1889

 The Utah Woman Suffrage Association is created.

1890s 
1890

Maria Y. Dougall and Sarah M. Kimball are delegates to the National Suffrage Convention in Washington, D.C.

1891

February 15: Suffragists celebrated the birthday of Susan B. Anthony in Salt Lake City.
 The Utah Woman Suffrage Song Book is published.

1892

July 29: Suffragists hold a rally in American Fork.
 Wells travels through California and Idaho and speaks on women's suffrage.
1893

 Suffragists held a garden party in Salt Lake City.
1895

February 18: Suffragists hold a convention in the Salt Lake City and County building.

1896

 Utah women regained the right to vote.
Martha Hughes Cannon becomes the first woman elected to state senate.
1897

January: Wells attends the National Suffrage Convention in Des Moines, Iowa and describes suffrage efforts in Utah.

1899

Carrie Chapman Catt and Mary Garrett Hay visit Salt Lake City.

20th century

1900s 

 Suffragists from Utah obtain 40,000 names for a women's suffrage petition to the United States Congress.
 Utah suffragists send delegates to the National Presidential Conventions.

1910s 
1919

 September 30: Utah ratifies the Nineteenth Amendment.

1920s 
1920

 February 12: Fiftieth anniversary celebration of women's suffrage in Utah.

1924

 The Indian Citizenship Act gives more voting rights to Native American women.

1950s 
1957

 Utah repeals laws that prevent women who live on Native American reservations from voting.

See also 

 List of Utah suffragists
 Women's suffrage in Utah
 Women's suffrage in the United States

References

Sources 

 
 

Utah suffrage
Timelines of states of the United States
Suffrage referendums